Lee Young-jin (born March 27, 1972) is a retired South Korean football player. He was a participant at 1996 AFC Asian Cup in the U.A.E.
After professional career, He was played at K3 (amateur) during 2007–2008.

He was appointed as assistant manager of FC Seoul in February 2013

References

External links 
 

1972 births
Living people
South Korean footballers
South Korean football managers
South Korea international footballers
Seongnam FC players
FC Seoul non-playing staff
1996 AFC Asian Cup players
Association football defenders